Bovadra is a painting by Ellen Banks. It is in the collection of the Addison Gallery of American Art in Andover, Massachusetts in the United States. 

The painting comprises acrylic paint on canvas. Completed in 1975, Bovadra is an abstract artwork that features sharp, at times triangular shapes, in grey and white shades. It is almost landscape-like in appearance. 

Bovadra was purchased by the Addison Gallery of American Art in 1975. It has been exhibited twice at the Addison Gallery:  

 1982, Afro-American Artists
 1988, Large Scale Works: Drawings, Prints, Photographs, Sculpture and Painting from the Addison Gallery of American Art

References

1975 paintings
Paintings in Massachusetts
Paintings by Ellen Banks